Buy Me a Gun is a 2018 Mexican drama film directed by Julio Hernández Cordón. It was selected to screen in the Directors' Fortnight section at the 2018 Cannes Film Festival.

References

External links
 

2018 films
2018 drama films
Mexican drama films
2010s Spanish-language films
2010s Mexican films